The 1979 Toledo Rockets football team was an American football team that represented the University of Toledo in the Mid-American Conference (MAC) during the 1979 NCAA Division I-A football season. In their third season under head coach Chuck Stobart, the Rockets compiled a 7–3–1 record (7–1–1 against MAC opponents), finished in second place in the MAC, and outscored all opponents by a combined total of 213 to 190.

The team's statistical leaders included Maurice Hall with 648 passing yards, Mike Alston with 806 rushing yards, and Butch Hunyadi with 500 receiving yards.

Schedule

References

Toledo
Toledo Rockets football seasons
Toledo Rockets football